Shenzhen CFC Changfu Centre (Chinese:CFC长富中心) is a supertall skyscraper in Shenzhen, Guangdong, China. Construction started in 2011 and was completed in January 2016.

See also
List of tallest buildings in Shenzhen
List of tallest buildings in China

References

Buildings and structures under construction in China
Skyscraper office buildings in Shenzhen